Sir Frederick William  Young (5 January 1876 – 26 August 1948) was an Australian agent-general, barrister, liberal/conservative politician and member of the South Australian House of Assembly.

Young was born in Blyth, South Australia and represented Stanley in the House of Assembly from 3 May 1902 to 26 May 1905. He later represented Wooroora from 13 February 1909 to 26 March 1915. From 17 February 1912 until 19 November 1914, Young was Commissioner of Crown Lands and Immigration for South Australia.

He married Florence, daughter of John Darling Jr. (1852–1914).

In 1918 he was elected Conservative Member of Parliament for Swindon in the United Kingdom Parliament. He stood down at the 1922 election. He was knighted in 1918.

Young died in Buckingham Gate, London, England.

External links

See also

 Walter James Young
 Randolph Isham Stow
 John Darling Sr.
 Archibald Peake

References

 

 

Lawyers from Sydney
1876 births
1948 deaths
Members of the South Australian House of Assembly
20th-century Australian politicians
Conservative Party (UK) MPs for English constituencies
Politicians from Sydney
UK MPs 1918–1922